Enterr10 Rangeela was a Bhojpuri entertainment channel that was owned by Enterr10 Television Network Private Limited.

History 
Enterr10 Rangeela was launched on September 22, 2020, as a Bhojpuri entertainment channel by Enterr10 Television Pvt Ltd. They later showed some dubbed series and original series, then launched a YouTube channel that was later turned into a music channel.  that have over 10.3 million subscribers as of 15 March 2023.

Former shows
Ramayan
Aashish Chhathi Maiya Ke
Crime Alert
Bandini
Meri Maa Vindhyavaasini
Tip Top Tarana
Rangeela T20
Pyar Ke Rang
Maai Ke Singaar
Bhayil Bhajan Ke Bela

See also
List of Bhojpuri-language television channels

References

Television channels and stations established in 2020
Television stations in Mumbai
Television stations in Uttar Pradesh
2020 establishments in Delhi